Chester Casmir Ostrowski (April 8, 1930 – October 10, 2001) was an American football defensive end in the National Football League (NFL) for the Washington Redskins.  He played college football at the University of Notre Dame, where he received BA in history, and was drafted in the tenth round of the 1952 NFL Draft.

References

External links
 

1930 births
2001 deaths
American football defensive ends
Notre Dame Fighting Irish football players
Washington Redskins players
Players of American football from Chicago
American people of Polish descent